"La Señal" is a song written and performed by Colombian singer Juanes, as part of his second live album Juanes MTV Unplugged (2012). The single was released worldwide as lead single of the album on March 5, 2012 in all radio stations and through iTunes. The song was produced by singer Juan Luis Guerra. "La Señal" is a Latin rock-pop, and the lyrics show us the importance of loving, is the family, the couples or the friends. And tick the love as motor of live and as the signal that Juanes wants to give in this song. The track was nominated for Rock/Alternative Song of the Year at the Premio Lo Nuestro 2013.

Music video
The video for the song was recorded in Miami Beach on February 2, 2012. The music video is now available in all channels worldwide audience, including YouTube.

Charts

Weekly charts

Year-end charts

See also
List of number-one songs of 2012 (Mexico)
List of number-one Billboard Top Latin Songs of 2012

References

External links
Juanes "La Señal"

2012 singles
Monitor Latino Top General number-one singles
Number-one singles in Colombia
Record Report Top 100 number-one singles
Record Report Pop Rock General number-one singles
Record Report Top Latino number-one singles
Songs written by Juanes
Songs written by Juan Luis Guerra
Pop ballads
Universal Music Latino singles
2012 songs